Lura Lake is a lake in Blue Earth County, Minnesota and Faribault County, Minnesota, in the United States.

According to tradition, Lura Lake was named by government surveyors who saw "Lura" carved into a tree near the lake.

References

Lakes of Minnesota
Lakes of Blue Earth County, Minnesota
Lakes of Faribault County, Minnesota